Shinwari District is a district of Parwan province, Afghanistan.

Demographics 
The district is mostly populated by the Shinwari tribe of Pashtuns. The estimated population in 2019 was 45,699.

See also 
 Districts of Afghanistan

References 

Districts of Parwan Province